Hira Station may refer to:

 Hira Station (Aichi), Japan
 Hira Station (Shiga), Japan